The Skylarks are Singing is a 1953 Soviet Belarusian comedy film directed by Uładzimier Korš-Sablin and Kanstancin Sańnikaŭ.

Cast
 Liliya Stepanovna Drozdova as Nascia  
 Ivan Šaciła as Mikoła Vieras  
 Lidzija Ržeckaja as Aŭdoćcia
 Viera Poła as Paŭlina  
 Uładzimier Dziadziuška as Pytlovannyj  
 Hleb Hlebaŭ as Symon Vieras  
 Pavel Molchanov as Regional Committee Secretary  
 Barys Płatonaŭ as Tumiłovič 
 Leanid Barančyk 
 Kanstancin Siankievič 
 Maryja Zinkievič as Collective Farmer

References

Bibliography 
 Prominent Personalities in the USSR. Scarecrow Press, 1968.

External links 
 

1953 films
1953 comedy films
Soviet comedy films
1950s Russian-language films
Belarusfilm films
Belarusian comedy films
Soviet-era Belarusian films
Soviet black-and-white films